Television is an American rock band from New York City, most notably active in the 1970s. The group's most prominent lineup consisted of Tom Verlaine (vocals, guitar), Richard Lloyd (guitar), Billy Ficca (drums), and Fred Smith (bass). An early fixture of CBGB and the 1970s New York rock scene, the band is considered influential in the development of punk and alternative rock.

Although they recorded in a stripped-down, guitar-based manner similar to their punk contemporaries, Television's music was by comparison clean, improvisational, and technically proficient, drawing influence from jazz and 1960s rock. The group's 1977 debut album, Marquee Moon, is considered one of the defining releases of the punk era.

History

Early history and formation 

Television's roots can be traced to the teenage friendship between Tom Verlaine and Richard Hell. The duo met at Sanford School in Hockessin, Delaware, from which they ran away. Both moved to New York, separately, in the early 1970s, aspiring to be poets.

Their first group together was the Neon Boys, consisting of Verlaine on guitar and vocals, Hell on bass and vocals and Billy Ficca on drums. The group lasted from late 1972 to March 11, 1973. A 7-inch record featuring "That's All I Know (Right Now)" and "Love Comes in Spurts" was released in 1980.

On March 12, 1973, the group reformed, calling themselves Television and recruiting Richard Lloyd as a second guitarist. The name, devised by Hell, was a pun on 'tell a vision' as well as a reference to reclaiming the dominant media of the era. Their first gig was at the Townhouse Theatre, on March 2, 1974. Their manager, Terry Ork, persuaded CBGB owner Hilly Kristal to give the band a regular gig at his club, where they reportedly constructed their first stage. After playing several gigs at CBGB in early 1974, they played at Max's Kansas City and other clubs, returning to CBGB in January 1975, where they established a significant cult following.

Departure of Richard Hell and debut release 

Initially, songwriting was split almost equally between Hell and Verlaine, Lloyd being an infrequent contributor as well. However, friction began to develop as Verlaine, Lloyd, and Ficca became increasingly confident and adept with both instruments and composition, while Hell remained defiantly untrained in his approach. Verlaine, feeling that Hell's frenzied onstage demeanor was upstaging his songs, reportedly told him to "stop jumping around" during the songs and occasionally refused to play Hell's songs, such as "Blank Generation", in concert. This conflict, as well as one of their songs being picked up by Island Records, led Hell to leave the group and take some of his songs with him. He co-founded the Heartbreakers in 1975 with former New York Dolls Johnny Thunders and Jerry Nolan, later forming Richard Hell and the Voidoids. Fred Smith, briefly of Blondie, replaced Hell as Television's bassist.

Television made their vinyl debut in 1975 with "Little Johnny Jewel" (Parts One and Two), a 7-inch single on the independent label Ork Records, owned by their manager, Terry Ork. Richard Lloyd apparently disagreed with the selection of this song, preferring "O Mi Amore" for their debut, to the extent that he seriously considered leaving the band. Reportedly Pere Ubu guitarist Peter Laughner auditioned for his spot during this time.

Marquee Moon, Adventure and break-up (1977–78) 

Television's first album, Marquee Moon, was received positively by music critics and audiences and entered the Billboard 200 albums chart – it also sold well in Europe and reached the Top 30 in many countries there. Upon its initial release in 1977, Roy Trakin wrote in the SoHo Weekly "forget everything you've heard about Television, forget punk, forget New York, forget CBGB's ... hell, forget rock and roll—this is the real item." Critics have since ranked the album number 83 on cable music channel VH1's 2000 list of the 100 Greatest Albums of Rock and Roll and number 128 on Rolling Stone's 2003 list of the 500 greatest albums of all time. It was ranked number two in Uncut magazine's "100 Greatest Debut Records" and number 3 on Pitchfork Media's list of the best albums of the 1970s. Stephen Thomas Erlewine of AllMusic writes that the album was "revolutionary" and composed "entirely of tense garage rockers that spiral into heady intellectual territory, which is achieved through the group's long, interweaving instrumental sections."

Television's second album, Adventure, was recorded and released in 1978. Softer and more reflective than their debut album, Adventure was well received by critics despite modest sales.

The members' independent and strongly held artistic visions, along with Richard Lloyd's drug abuse, led to the band's break-up in July 1978. Both Lloyd and Verlaine pursued solo careers, while Ficca became the drummer for the new wave band The Waitresses.

Reformation (1992–present) 
Television reformed in 1992, released a self-titled third album and have performed live sporadically thereafter. After being wooed back on stage together for the 2001 All Tomorrow's Parties festival at Camber Sands, England, they played a number of dates around the world on an irregular basis.

In 2007, Richard Lloyd announced he would be amicably leaving the band after a midsummer show in New York City's Central Park. Due to an extended hospital stay recovering from pneumonia, he was unable to make the Central Park concert. Jimmy Rip substituted for him that day and was subsequently asked to join the band full-time in Lloyd's place. On July 7, 2011, the new lineup performed at the Beco 203 music festival in São Paulo, Brazil. In an MTV Brazil interview, the band confirmed that an album with about ten new tracks was close to being finished, but as of 2023, that album has not surfaced. In the 2010s, the band kept on touring performing Marquee Moon in its entirety; they notably did European tours in 2014 and 2016. In New York in October 2015, the band performed a four-song show that lasted an hour: Village Voice reviewed it saying the hightlight of the set was a new number "Persia", dubbing it "a pulsing, rhythmic exploration lasting close to 20 minutes, to which each member of the band contributed in equal strength".

Verlaine died on January 28, 2023, at the age of 73.

Musical style and influences 

As with many emerging punk bands, the Velvet Underground was a strong influence. Television also drew inspiration from minimalist composers such as Steve Reich. Tom Verlaine has often cited the influence of surf bands the Ventures and Dick Dale on Television's approach to the guitar, and he has also expressed a fondness for the bands Love and Buffalo Springfield, two groups noted for their dual-guitar interplay. Television's ties to punk were underscored by their late '60s garage rock leanings; the band often covered the Count Five's "Psychotic Reaction" and the 13th Floor Elevators' "Fire Engine" in concert.

Lester Bangs heard in Television's music the influence of Quicksilver Messenger Service, noting a similarity between Verlaine's guitar playing and John Cipollina's. Tom Verlaine has downplayed the comparison, citing The Ventures as a more apt reference point.

Though Verlaine and Lloyd were nominally "rhythm" and "lead" guitarists, they often rendered such labels obsolete by crafting interlocking parts, where the ostensible rhythm role could be as intriguing as the lead. Al Handa writes, "In Television's case, Lloyd was the guitarist who affected the tonality of the music more often than not, and Verlaine and the rhythm section the ones who gave the ear its anchor and familiar musical elements. Listen only to Lloyd, and you can hear some truly off the wall ideas being played." The opening of the song "Marquee Moon" from the album of the same name displays the band's characteristic interlocking melodic and rhythmic guitar lines.

Members 
Current
Billy Ficca – drums 
Fred Smith – bass, vocals 
Jimmy Rip – guitar 

Former members
Tom Verlaine – vocals, guitar, keyboards 
Richard Lloyd – guitar, vocals 
Richard Hell – vocals, bass 

Timeline

Discography 
Studio albums
 Marquee Moon (Elektra) (1977) #92 AUS, #23 Sweden, #28 UK
 Adventure (Elektra) (1978) #7 UK
 Television (Capitol) (1992)

Live albums
 The Blow-Up (ROIR) (1982)
 Live at the Academy, 1992 (Ohoo Music) (2003)
 Live at the Old Waldorf (Rhino Handmade/Elektra) (2003)

Compilation albums
 The Best of Television & Tom Verlaine (EastWest Japan) (1998)

Singles
 "Little Johnny Jewel, Part One" b/w "Little Johnny Jewel, Part Two" (Ork) (1975)
 "Marquee Moon Part 1" b/w "Marquee Moon Part 2" (Elektra) (1977) #30 UK
 "Marquee Moon (Stereo)" b/w "Marquee Moon (Mono)" (Elektra) (1977)
 "Venus" b/w "Friction" (Elektra) (1977)
 "Prove It" b/w "Venus" 12" 45 (Elektra) (1977) #25 UK
 "Foxhole" b/w "Careful" (Elektra) (1978) #36 UK
 "Glory" b/w "Carried Away" (Elektra) (1978)
 "Ain't That Nothin'" b/w "Glory" (Elektra) (1978)
 "Call Mr. Lee" (Capitol) (1992) #27 Billboard Modern Rock Tracks

Filmography 

 The Blank Generation (1976)
 CBGB (2013)

References

Citations

General and cited references  

 
 
 
 
  *

External links 
 
 

American post-punk music groups
American art rock groups
Capitol Records artists
Elektra Records artists
Musical groups established in 1973
Musical groups disestablished in 1978
Musical groups reestablished in 1992
Musical groups disestablished in 1993
Musical groups reestablished in 2001
Musical groups from New York City
Musical quartets
Protopunk groups
Punk rock groups from New York (state)
ROIR artists